Aaron Johnston (born 2 February 1995) is an Irish rallying co-driver. He is currently partnered with Takamoto Katsuta for Toyota Gazoo Racing WRT in the World Rally Championship .

Rally career
Johnston's rally career began at the age of sixteen. At the 2019 Wales Rally GB, he made his WRC debut by co-driving with Oliver Solberg in a Volkswagen Polo GTI R5 in the WRC-2 category. Both Johnston and Solberg were signed by Hyundai Motorsport to compete for the 2021 World Rally Championship-2.

On 16 September 2021 he and Solberg announce their split after 3 years of collaboration. Just five days later on the 21 of September Johnston announce he will partnered japanese driver Takamoto Katsuta for the 2021 Rally Finland, replacing the injured Daniel Barrit.

Rally victories

ERC victories

Rally record

WRC results
 
* Season still in progress.

WRC-2 results

WRC-3 results

ERC results

References

External links
 Aaron Johnston's e-wrc profile

1995 births
Living people
Irish co-drivers
World Rally Championship co-drivers